Francis Martin Tomkinson  (21 October 1883 – 24 November 1963) was an English cricketer who played one first-class cricket match, for Worcestershire against Hampshire in 1902. He made a duck in his only innings, but did take one catch, to dismiss Arthur Webb off the bowling of George Alfred Wilson.

On 2 December 1916 Tomkinson took over as Commanding Officer with the rank of lieutenant colonel in 1/7th Battalion, Worcestershire Regiment, in which he remained in the position until 4 April 1919.  During his service, he was awarded a DSO and Bar in 1917.  On 1 July 1929 he became 'Honorary Colonel' in the 7th Worcs.

He was a member of the well-known Kidderminster carpet-making family.

Tomkinson was born at Franche Hall, Kidderminster, Worcestershire; he died at Chilton, Cleobury Mortimer, Shropshire at the age of 80.

His brother Geoffrey played twice for Worcestershire.

References

External links
 

1883 births
1963 deaths
British Army personnel of World War I
Companions of the Distinguished Service Order
English cricketers
Worcestershire cricketers
Sportspeople from Kidderminster